N-carbamoylase may refer to:
 N-carbamoyl-D-amino acid hydrolase, an enzyme
 N-carbamoyl-L-amino-acid hydrolase, an enzyme